Reliability Engineering and Risk Analysis: A Practical Guide is a textbook on techniques for analysis of reliability and risk, written by Mohammad Modarres, Mark Kaminskiy, and Vasiliy Krivtsov.

References

Engineering textbooks
Engineering education